PLUS Football Club is a football club of PLUS Expressways Berhad, the main toll highway operator company of the Malaysian Expressway System. The club currently plays in the fourth Division of Malaysian football, the Kuala Lumpur League. Their home stadium is the MBPJ Stadium, Kelana Jaya, Petaling Jaya, Selangor. Starts in an amateur KLFA Division 2 League in 2000. After 2 years be promoted to KLFA Division 1 League and become KLFA Cup champion in 2004 subsequently qualify to FAM Cup in 2005. Promoted to the 2nd Division of Malaysian league, Premier League Malaysia in 2007 and a year later becomes Runner-Up of this division and automatically promoted to Super League Malaysia 2009 in 2009. The club finished a commendable 7th place in its first season of the Super League Malaysia and reached the quarter-finals stage of the 2009 Malaysia Cup.

PLUS FC withdrew from the 2011 Super League Malaysia following a corporate exercise of PLUS Expressways. They were replaced by Harimau Muda A for the spot at the 2011 Super League Malaysia.

PLUS FC came back in Kuala Lumpur League Division 1 in year 2013 and also want rejoin to the M-League after 4 years hiatus.

Honours

Achievements (2006–2010)

Former player
Local players

  Bobby Gonzales
  Irwan Fadzli Idrus
  Fadzli Saari
  Nazrulerwan Makmor
  Raimi Mohd Nor
  Safiq Rahim
  Norhafiz Zamani Misbah
  Ramesh Lai
  Mohd Rozul Harris Mohd Nasir
  Razi Effendi Suhit
  Nizaruddin Yusof
  Shahazriz Redwan
  Reeshafiq Alwi

 Foreign players

  Alex Agbo
  Adrian Trinidad
  Tércio Nunes Machado

Team managers

Team coaches

References

External links
 KL PLUS FC blog

Football clubs in Malaysia
2000 establishments in Malaysia
2010 disestablishments in Malaysia
PLUS Expressways
Association football clubs established in 2000